G600 may refer to:

 Gulfstream G600, a twin-engine business jet
 Huawei Ascend G600, an Android smartphone
 Samsung G600, a mobile phone